The Lazy Boy (French - Le Petit Paresseux) is a 1755 oil-on-canvas painting by the French artist Jean-Baptiste Greuze, now in the Musée Fabre in Montpellier, to which it was left in 1837 by François-Xavier Fabre. It depicts a child that felt asleep while reading a book.

References

1755 paintings
Paintings in the collection of the Musée Fabre
Paintings of children
Paintings by Jean-Baptiste Greuze